Odzrkhe or Odzrakhe ( or ) was a historic fortified town and the surrounding area in what is now Abastumani, Adigeni Municipality in Samtskhe-Javakheti region, southern Georgia.

History 
According to medieval Georgian historic tradition, it was founded by the mythic hero Odzrakhos of the Kartlosid line. The ruins of old fortifications are still visible around the site.  Odzrkhe  or  Odzrakhe considered to be the old name
of Samtskhe or Meskheti.

See also
 Byzeres

References 

Archaeological sites in Georgia (country)
Former provinces of Georgia (country)
Former populated places in the Caucasus
Historical regions of Georgia (country)
Buildings and structures in Samtskhe–Javakheti